Barragan or Barragán may refer to:

Barragan (surname)
Barragan Luisenbarn, the second espada in the manga Bleach
Barragán (Blonde Redhead album), 2014
"Barragán", the title track from the album
Luis Barragán House and Studio, the former residence of architect Luis Barragán in Mexico City